The Derna is a right tributary of the river Valea Fânețelor in Romania. It flows into the Valea Fânețelor in Sărsig.

References

Rivers of Romania
Rivers of Bihor County